Papyrocranus congoensis is a species of ray-finned fish in the family Notopteridae found in the Congo River basin of Africa.

References 

Notopteridae
Freshwater fish of Africa
Fish described in 1932
Endemic fauna of the Democratic Republic of the Congo